UEV may refer to:

 Unit Emergy Values, emergy inputs required to generate one unit of output from a process
 Kua-UEV, a human gene